Ahmadabad-e Tappeh (also Romanized as Aḩmadābād-e Tappeh; also known as Aḩmadābād) is a village in Shur Dasht Rural District, Shara District, Hamadan County, Hamadan Province, Iran. At the 2006 census, its population was 615, in 129 families.

References 

Populated places in Hamadan County